List of Ministers of Finance of Mali since the creation of Mali Federation and independence of Mali:

Ministers of Finance
Attaher Maïga, 1959-1965
Louis Negre, 1966-1970
Amadou Baba Diarra, 1970-1973
Tiéoulé Mamadou Konaté, 1973-1975
Founèkè Keita, 1975-1978
Amadou Baba Diarra, 1978-1979
Mady Diallo, 1979-1980
Drissa Keita, 1980-1984
Dianka Kaba Diakite, 1984-1987
Soumana Sacko, 1987
Mohamed Alhousséyni Toure, 1987-1988
Tiéna Coulibaly, 1988-1991
Bassary Touré, 1991-1992
Mahamar Oumar Maiga, 1992-1993
Soumaila Cisse, 1993-2000
Bakari Koné, 2000-2002
Ousmane Issoufi Maïga, 2002
Bassary Touré, 2002-2004
Ousmane Issoufi Maiga, 2004
Abou-Bakar Traoré, 2004-2008
Ba Fatoumata Nènè Sy, 2008
Ahmadou Abdoulaye Diallo, 2008-2009
Sanoussi Touré, 2009-2011
Lassine Bouaré, 2011-2012
Tiéna Coulibaly, 2012-2013
Abdel Karim Konaté, 2013
Bouaré Fily Sissoko, 2013-2015
Mamadou Igor Diarra, 2015-2016
Boubou Cissé, 2016-2020
Abdoulaye Daffé, 2020-

See also 
 Economy of Mali

References

External links 
 Ministère de l'Économie et des Finances

Government of Mali
Government ministers of Mali

Economy of Mali